The men's featherweight (−67 kilograms) event at the 2002 Asian Games took place on 13 October 2002 at Gudeok Gymnasium, Busan, South Korea.

Schedule
All times are Korea Standard Time (UTC+09:00)

Results 
Legend
DQ — Won by disqualification
R — Won by referee stop contest

Final

Top half

Bottom half

References
2002 Asian Games Official Report, Page 721

External links
Official website

Taekwondo at the 2002 Asian Games